Our Lady of Peace High School is a private Salesian school in Malabang, Lanao del Sur, Philippines. It was founded in 1954. It has 17 teachers and a Director. Fr. Rogelio Del Rosario MJ is the first Filipino Priest. He became director after Fr. Rufus Halley's death on August 28, 2001.

Schools in Lanao del Sur
High schools in the Philippines